Hind-Pak Bordernama (2015) is a Punjabi-language novel written by Indian author Nirmal Singh Nimma Langha. This is an autobiographical work based on Langha's own love story.

Synopsis 
In 1981 Langha, an Indian Sikh, was studying for an M.A. degree in Punjabi literature at Guru Nanak Dev University, Amritsar in India. There he got influenced by Naxalite movement and started to write songs and poems. At that time, he fell in love with Naseema, a Muslim girl from Punjab, Pakistan. To meet the girl, Langha crossed the India-Pakistan border several times, in the 1980s, without any visa or authorization. According to Langha, Naseema too crossed the border once and visited Punjab, India and Delhi. After two and a half years, Langha was arrested by the Pakistani security agency. Naseema fought very hard and even arranged  to have Langha released. In 1986, Langha met Naseema for the last time. In 1988, barbed wires were installed on the India–Pakistan border. After that they never met again.

Novel's publication 
Langha told his story to Punjabi writer Gurbachan Singh Bhullar and Bhullar suggested to pen it down. Following this suggestion, Langha started writing this novel in 1995, but no publisher was ready to publish it because the novel contained details of illegal immigration. In 2015, the novel was published by Chak Staran Prakashan. The book launching event took place on 10 October 2015 at Punjabi Bhawan in Ludhiana.

References 

2015 novels
Punjabi-language novels
Novels based on actual events
2015 Indian novels
Novels set in India
India–Pakistan relations in popular culture
Indian autobiographical novels
Indian romance novels
Novels about Indian prostitution
Indian political novels
Indian historical novels
Novels about immigration
India–Pakistan border
Novels set in Pakistan
Novels set in Lahore
Novels set in Islamabad